Seki A Oe: A Crazy Samoan Love Story is a 2013 romantic comedy film written and directed by Zena Iese, filmed and set in American Samoa. The film is principally in the Samoan language, and the title means "you are awesome" in Samoan.

Production

Director-writer-editor Zena Iese had previously produced a short film, Heart to Heart – Fatu O Le Alofa. Filming took place in Pago Pago; the ʻava ceremony scene was filmed at Veterans Memorial Stadium. The film was partially financed via FundRazr.

Synopsis
Jack falls in love with Angel, but is rejected. Diana, a faʻafafine, coaches Jack on how to win a woman.

Release
Seki A Oe: A Crazy Samoan Love Story had its world premiere on at the Governor H. Rex Lee Auditorium in Pago Pago.

References

External links
 

2013 romantic comedy films
Samoan films
Films set in American Samoa
Films shot in American Samoa
Indigenous films
Samoan-language films
Fa'afafine